John Eric Herlitz (December 30, 1942 – March 24, 2008) was an American industrialist most commonly known for his styling of cars at Chrysler Corporation, particularly the Plymouth Barracuda production car and Dodge Copperhead concept car.

Early life
John Herlitz was born to Swedish immigrants in Pine Plains, New York. At 13, he started sending sketches of cars to Chrysler; company officials told him what education they would seek for stylists, and he proceeded to get a bachelor's degree in industrial design from the Pratt Institute.

Career
Immediately upon graduation in 1964, Herlitz started working for Plymouth, where he created the Barracuda SX show car. The Barracuda SX show car greatly influenced the 1967 Plymouth Barracuda. Herlitz was then called to the National Guard before returning to Plymouth, where he led the styling of the completely new 1970 Barracuda and 'Cuda. Following the 1970 Barracuda, Herlitz led the styling for the 1971 Plymouth GTX and Plymouth Road Runner. He assumed progressive responsibility in the design studios, working on the styling of progressive generations of vehicles including the K-cars, minivans, and cab forward cars as well as various concept cars.  In 1994, Herlitz was named vice president for product design, working directly under former engineer Tom Gale; he was later promoted to senior vice-president for product design. In June 2000, John Herlitz announced his intent to retire from Chrysler. In his later years at Chrysler, he helped to establish the Walter P. Chrysler Museum, where his retirement party was held in November 2000. In January 2001, he officially retired from Chrysler.

After Chrysler
Afterwards, he helped to design a visual arts building in Michigan, served on the Interlochen Center for the Arts' corporate advisory council, and was a judge in some car shows.

Personal life
Mr. Herlitz married Joan Elizabeth Neinas on September 20, 1969, and had two sons and two grandchildren. He died in 2008 from complications after a fall in his winter home in Florida.

Notes

References
  
 
 

1942 births
2008 deaths
Chrysler executives
American automobile designers
Chrysler designers
People in the automobile industry
American people of Swedish descent